Chandler–Gilbert Community College (CGCC) is a public community college with multiple locations in Maricopa County, Arizona. It is part of the Maricopa County Community College District. In fall 2018, 14,728 students were enrolled at the college.

History 
CGCC was founded in 1985 as an extension of Mesa Community College. It was later independently accredited in 1992.

Presidents
 Arnette Scott Ward (1985–2002)
 Maria Hesse (2002–2009)
 Linda Lujan (2009–2015)
 William Guerriero (2015–2018)
 Greg Peterson (2018–present)

Campus 
The college operates from four locations including the Pecos campus, Williams campus, Sun Lakes center and Communiversity in Queen Creek.

Academics 
The college is divided into divisions, which are Aviation and Applied Technology Division, Biological Sciences Division, Business and Computing Studies Division, Communication and Fine Arts Division, Composition, Creative Writing and Literature Division, Modern Languages and Humanities Division, Social and Behavioral Sciences Division, Mathematics Division, Nursing Division, and Health Sciences Division, Physical Sciences and Engineering Division, and Library, Learning Center, and Counseling Division.

Student life 
The college athletics teams are nicknamed the Coyotes.

Notable alumni 
 Andre Ethier, professional baseball player
 Jaron Long, professional baseball player
 James Pazos, professional baseball player
 Dennis Sarfate, professional baseball player

References

External links 
 Official website

 
Buildings and structures in Chandler, Arizona
Community colleges in Arizona
Education in Chandler, Arizona
Education in Gilbert, Arizona
Education in Mesa, Arizona
Educational institutions established in 1985
Maricopa County Community College District
Universities and colleges in Maricopa County, Arizona
NJCAA athletics
1985 establishments in Arizona